A  is a Japanese tool thought to be originally derived from the masonry trowel. The two widely recognized variations of the kunai are short kunai (小苦無 shō-kunai) and the big kunai (大苦無 dai-kunai). Although a basic tool, in the hands of a martial arts expert, the kunai could be used as a multi-functional weapon. The kunai is commonly associated with the ninja, who used it to gouge holes in walls.

Design 
A Kunai normally had a leaf-shaped wrought blade in lengths ranging from 20 cm to 30 cm and a handle with a ring on the pommel for attaching a rope. The attached rope allowed the kunai'''s handle to be wrapped to function as a grip, or to be strapped to a stick as a makeshift spear; to be tied to the body for concealment; to be used as an anchor or piton, and sometimes to be used as the Chinese rope dart. Contrary to popular belief, kunai were not designed to be used primarily as throwing weapons. Instead, kunai were primarily tools and, when used as weapons, were stabbing and thrusting implements.

Varieties of kunai include short, long, narrow-bladed, saw-toothed, and wide-bladed. In some cases, the kunai and the Nishikori, a wide-bladed saw with a dagger-type handle, are difficult to distinguish.

Uses
The kunai was originally used by peasants as a multi-purpose gardening tool and by workers of stone and masonry. The blade is made of soft iron and is left unsharpened because the edges are used to smash relatively soft materials such as plaster and wood, for digging holes, and for prying. Normally, only the tip is sharpened.

 Weapon 
Many ninja weapons were adapted from farming tools, not unlike those used by Shaolin monks in China. Since kunai were cheaply produced farming tools of proper size and weight and could be easily sharpened, they were readily available to be converted into simple weapons.  As a weapon, the kunai is larger and heavier than a shuriken and with the grip could also be used in hand-to-hand combat more readily than a shuriken. 

As with ninjutsu, the exaggeration persistent in ninja myths played a large role in creating the popular culture image of kunai. In fictional depictions of ninjas, the kunai is commonly portrayed as a steel knife that is used for stabbing or particularly throwing, sometimes confusing it with the shuriken.

Masonry
The kunai'' was used in masonry to shape stonework.

See also
 Dart (missile)
 Entrenching tool
 Flechette
 Hori hori
 Shuriken
 Tantō
 Tent peg
 Throwing knife
 Trowel

References

Sources

Further reading 
 
 

Gardening tools
Japanese martial arts terminology
Ninjutsu artefacts
Mechanical hand tools
Throwing weapons
Weapons of Japan